"Letters" is a song by Japanese musician Hikaru Utada. It was released as a double A-side single with the song "Sakura Drops" on May 9, 2002.

Background and development 

Since she debuted as a musician in 1998, Utada had worked as the primary or sole songwriter for her music. Beginning with her second album Distance (2001), Utada began to co-arrange songs, such as "Wait & See (Risk)", "Distance" and "Kettobase!" The bonus track on Distance, "Hayatochi-Remix", was arranged entirely by Utada. In March 2002, Hikaru Utada released "Hikari", the theme song for the game Kingdom Hearts.

"Letters" was written and arranged solely by Utada. It featured six different guitarists all performing the acoustic guitar in the backing, including Char, Hisashi from Glay and her own father Teruzane Utada.

Promotion and release 

The song was used in commercials for NTT DoCoMo's 2002 range of FOMA cellphones. This was the third song of Utada's to be used in collaboration with DoCoMo, after "Final Distance" (2001) and "Traveling" (2002). On May 20, 2002, Utada performed the song live at Hey! Hey! Hey! Music Champ, a week after she performed the single's other A-side "Sakura Drops".

Utada performed the song during her Hikaru no 5 Budokan residency show in 2004, at her Utada United 2006 Japanese tour and at her two date concert series Wild Life in December 2010.

Covers 

In 2014, "Letters" was recorded by Ringo Sheena for Utada Hikaru no Uta, a tribute album celebrating 15 years since Utada's debut. It was released as a preceding download from the album on December 3, 2014.

Critical reception 

Critical reception to the song was positive. Hayashi of Ongaku DB felt "Letters" was a "Latin-sounding number" with a melody that had a "high level of freedom". CDJournal reviewers described the song as having a "spicy Latin/gypsy" sound, and praised the "passionate melody", and noted how the upbeat rhythm contrasted with the lyrics, which dealt with "melancholic everyday feelings". Kanako Hanakawa of Shinko Music felt that the song had a mature mood, and that it was "sexier" than her other songs due to the guitar backing of so many older male guitarists. Akiyoshi Sekine of CD Data praised the song's "percussive rhythm", and praised the skill and sense that went into Utada's arrangement of the song.

Track listing

Personnel

Personnel details were sourced from Deep River's liner notes booklet.

Hironori Akiyama – acoustic guitar
Char – acoustic guitar
Hisashi from Glay – acoustic guitar
Yuichiro Larry Honda – acoustic guitar
Goh Hotoda – recording
Tsunemi Kawahide – synthesizer programming
Kei Kawano – acoustic piano, arrangement, keyboards, programming
Atsushi Matsui – recording
Akira Miyake – production
Yuji Toriyama – acoustic guitar
Masaaki Ugajin – recording
Hikaru Utada – arrangement, producer, writing, vocals
Teruzane "Sking" Utada – acoustic guitar, production

Chart rankings

Sales and certifications

Release history

References 

2002 songs
2002 singles
Hikaru Utada songs
Japanese-language songs
Oricon Weekly number-one singles
Songs used as jingles
Songs written by Hikaru Utada